The Journal of Human Rights is a quarterly peer-reviewed academic journal covering human rights studies and practices, and natural and legal rights in context of national and international law, and international relations. It is published by Routledge and is currently housed at the University of Connecticut, Storrs with Shareen Hertel as editor-in-chief. The journal was established in 2001 by founding editor-in-chief Thomas Cushman (Wellesley College).

Abstracting and indexing
The journal is abstracted and indexed:
Current Contents/Social And Behavioral Sciences
EBSCO databases
International Bibliography of the Social Sciences
Modern Language Association Database
ProQuest databases
Scopus
Social Sciences Citation Index
According to the Journal Citation Reports, the journal has a 2020 impact factor of 0.694.

References

External links

Human rights journals
Routledge academic journals
Publications established in 2002
Quarterly journals
English-language journals